Ghetto Street Funk is the debut album by Dungeon Family group members P.A. (Parental Advisory), released in November 9, 1993, on MCA Records. It is mainly produced by Organized Noize.

Track listing
 ""Strictly Butcher" - 3:34
 "Da Boom" - 4:34
 "Lifeline" (Remix) - 4:39
 "Bullshit" - 0:22
 "Maniac" - 4:17
 "BB" - 4:33
 "Sex in da Morning" - 2:50
 "Ghetto Break" (Interlude) - 5:30
 "Ghetto Head Hunta" - 3:28
 "Let Loose the Lingo" - 4:12
 "Manifest" - 4:08
 "Milk" - 3:14
 "Reyes Not Fall" - 3:58
 "Da End" - 0:21

References

1993 albums
MCA Records albums
P.A. (group) albums
Albums produced by DJ Toomp
Albums produced by Organized Noize